A preliminary ruling is a decision of the European Court of Justice (ECJ) on the interpretation of European Union law that is given in response to a request (preliminary reference) from a court or a tribunal of a member state. A preliminary ruling is a final determination of European Union law, with no scope for appeal. The ECJ hands down its decision to the referring court, which is then obliged to implement the ruling.

Preliminary rulings are issued by the ECJ. The Treaty of Lisbon provides that jurisdiction may be delegated to the General Court, but that provision has yet to be put into effect. If, as in Factortame, the ECJ holds that a member state's legislation conflicts with EU law, the member state is required to "disapply" such law, but the ECJ may not amend the member state's legislation itself.

Preliminary rulings make up the bulk of business in the Court of Justice of the European Union since few persons have locus standi to litigate in the Luxembourg court. "Privileged parties" with standing include all member states and EU institutions, but a private person or "undertaking" has standing only if it is the addressee of an EU decision.

Procedure
If a court or tribunal of a member state finds a provision of EU law to be ambiguous, equivocal or unclear, it may seek a preliminary ruling, and a court or tribunal from which there is no appeal must make an application. In either case, the domestic court be adjourned until the ECJ ruling is issued. The question to the ECJ must be short and succinct, but it may be accompanied by documents explaining the issue's context and circumstances. The ECJ may decline to give judgement in the absence of a genuine dispute on the basis that it will not consider "moot points".

Article 267 of the Treaty on the Functioning of the European Union provides:

That is qualified by Article 275 (excluding Common Foreign and Security Policy) and Article 276 (excluding member state acts in the area of freedom, security and justice).

Right and duty to refer for preliminary ruling
The highest court in a jurisdiction must refer and  lower courts may refer to Article 267 TFEU. For the rules in the United Kingdom while it was an EU member state, see s 2(1) European Communities Act 1972 and Part 68 Civil Procedure Rules.

Article 267 of the Treaty on the Functioning of the European Union (TFEU), establishing the preliminary reference procedure, differentiates between the right and the duty of national courts to seek a preliminary ruling. Under the discretionary reference stipulated in Article 267(2) TFEU, a national "court or tribunal" may ask the ECJ to give a preliminary ruling if it considers that a decision on the question is "necessary" to enable it to judge a particular case. The obligatory reference (duty to refer) is established in two cases: with respect to national courts adjudicating at last instance (Article 267(3) TFEU) and with respect of all courts faced with a question of the validity of EU law.

The function of the obligation to refer is "to prevent a body of national case law not in accord with the rules of [EU] law from coming into existence in any member state": Case 107/76 Hoffmann-La Roche v Centrafarm at 5. Both the highest court in a member state and the Benelux court has the obligation to refer: Case C-337/95 Parfums Christian Dior v Evora.

The obligation of national courts of last instance to refer for a preliminary ruling when a question of the interpretation of EU law arises is subject to certain exceptions. In accordance with the jurisprudence of the Court, a national court is relieved from the duty to refer when questions of EU law are not relevant to the decision in the main proceedings, if a national court is "materially identical with a question which has already been subject of a preliminary ruling in a similar case" or if when the proper interpretation of EU law is "so obvious as to leave no scope for any reasonable doubt".().

Courts that may ask questions
What constitutes a "court or tribunal" is a matter of EU law and is not to be determined by reference to national law. In determining whether or not a body is a "court or tribunal of Member State", the EU courts take a number of issues into account: whether it is established by law is permanent, has compulsory jurisdiction, has an inter partes procedure, applies rules of law and is independent.

Only a body that "is established by law... is permanent... [whose] jurisdiction is compulsory... [whose] procedure is inter partes... applies rules of law and... is independent" can be a court or tribunal that may refer: Case C-53/03 Syfait v GlaxoSmithKlein at 29. A body with the right to refer under EU law cannot be deprived of it by national law: Cases 146/73 and 166/73 Rheinmühlen.

However, those criteria are not absolute. In Broekmeulen v Huisarts Registratie Commissie, the CJEU ruled that a body established under the auspices of the Royal Netherlands Society for the Promotion of Medicine was a "court or tribunal" within the meaning of the treaty even though the society was a private association. Also, the Benelux Court of Justice was considered a court within that context as a court common to several (Netherlands, Belgium and Luxembourg) member states. Also, the Unified Patent Court, as a court common to several member states is expected to have the ability to ask prejudicial questions.

Grounds 
Such a reference is possible for all EU acts regardless of direct effect: Case C-373/95 Maso and Others v INPS at 28. However, the ECJ will not hear preliminary references arising out of hypothetical disputes: Case 244/80 Foglia v Novello.

Interpreting non-EU instruments
The ECJ is competent to give rulings on the interpretation of treaties to which the EU is a party, as those treaties are considered to be part of EU law. Decisions of the ECJ are in such a case binding only on the EU, not the other parties to the agreement.

The ECJ claims jurisdiction to interpret international agreements concluded by the European Council since they are acts of an EU institution: Case 181/73 Haegeman v Belgium. That extends to the GATT for which EU has substituted its member states: Case C-267/81 SPI. That also applies to mixed agreements even if the issue only partly falls within EU law: Case C-53/96 Hermès v FHT at 32. The ECJ claims jurisdiction even over acts of institutions established by an association agreement: Case C-192/89 Sevince.

In contrast, the claim does not extend to an international agreement that was concluded by a member state before its EU accession if the agreement conflicts with EU law: Case C-158/91 Levy. The ECJ has jurisdiction confined to EU law and cannot consider the extent of reference to EU law by national provisions, which are a matter of national law: Case C-297/88 Dzodzi at 42. The ECJ does not interpret national law  that is worded identically to EU provisions: Case C-346/93 Kleinwort Benson v City of Glasgow District Council.

The ECJ is also competent regarding the application of certain treaties between EU member states but may be subject to different procedures. Two such treaties are the 1968 Brussels Convention on jurisdiction in civil and commercial matters and the 1980 Rome Convention on applicable law, which are now mostly replaced by the Brussels I and the Rome I Regulations, respectively.

A peculiarity relates to arbitration on the Brexit withdrawal agreement since arbiters must ask for a preliminary ruling in matters of EU law that is binding upon both the EU and the UK. Based on the same agreement, UK courts must or may ask for a preliminary ruling regarding how Northern Ireland has EU law applied, which is related mainly to trade in goods.

Effects 
The ECJ judgment in a reference is declaratory, and remedies, costs, etc. are matters for national courts. The ECJ may choose to rule only on the validity and the interpretation of EU law and to leave the application to the facts to the national court that made the reference: Case 36/74 Walrave and Koch v Union Cycliste Internationale. Alternatively, it may choose to rule very closely to the facts in the case: Case 32/75 Cristini v SNCF.

If the ECJ already ruled on a point in a previous case, there is no obligation to refer: Case 28/62 Da Costa. The decision is then res judicata (at least in the weak sense) and binds the national court a quo that made the reference, and future similar cases on the same issue require no further reference if the answer is "so obvious as to leave no scope for any reasonable doubt": Case 283/81 CILFIT, ECJ Rules of Procedure Article 104(3). "Where national legislation has been the subject of different relevant judicial constructions, some leading to the application of that legislation in compliance with [EU] law, others leading to the opposite application, it must be held that, at the very least, such legislation is not sufficiently clear to ensure its application in compliance with [EU] law": Case C-129/00 Commission v Italy at 33.

The ECJ judgment has the force of res judicata and is binding not only on the national court on whose initiative the reference for a preliminary ruling was made but also on all member states' national courts. In the United Kingdom when it was a member state, res judicata was in the strong sense: a previous ECJ ruling would bind of its courts: s 3(1) European Communities Act 1972.

In the context of a reference for a preliminary ruling concerning validity, if the European instrument is declared invalid, all of the instruments adopted based on it are also invalid. It then falls to the competent European institutions to adopt a new instrument to rectify the situation.

Similar systems
The possibility to ask for a preliminary ruling is also embedded in other legal systems: 
The courts of Belgium, the Netherlands and Luxembourg may ask "questions regarding the interpretation of the law" to the Benelux Court of Justice regarding certain Benelux conventions and regulations. 
Iceland, Liechtenstein and Norway may request the EFTA Court of Justice for an advisory opinion regarding the interpretation of the European Economic Area Agreement, as well as EU regulations that apply to those states.

See also
Reference question, submission by the federal or a provincial government under Canadian law

References
Kari Joutsamo. The Role of Preliminary Rulings in the European Communities. Suomalainen Tiedeakatemia. 1979. Google.
Henry Schermers. "Preliminary Rulings". Judicial Protection in the European Communities. Kluwer Law and Taxation Publishers Deventer. Third Edition. 1983. Reprinted. Springer. Part B of Part 1 of Chapter 4. Sections 554 to 625. Pages 350 to 397.
Robert Schütze. "Preliminary Rulings" I and II: "General Aspects" and "Special Aspects". An Introduction to European Law. Third Edition. Oxford University Press. 2020. Pages 167 to 178. Cambridge University Press. 2012. Page 152 et seq.
Broberg and Fenger on Preliminary References to the European Court of Justice. Oxford University Press. Third Edition. 2021. Preliminary References to the European Court of Justice. Second Edition. 2014.
Jasper Krommendijk. National Courts and Preliminary References to the Court of Justice. (Elgar Studies in European Law and Policy). Edward Elgar. 2021. Google.
Clelia Lacchi. Preliminary References to the Court of Justice of the European Union and Effective Judicial Protection. (Collection of the Faculty of Law, Economics and Finance of the University of Luxembourg). Éditions Larcier. 2020. Google.
Woods and Watson. "The preliminary ruling procedure". Steiner & Woods EU Law. Eleventh Edition. Oxford University Press. 2012. Chapter 10. Pages 214 to 241.
Trevor Hartley. "Preliminary References". The Foundations of European Union Law. Seventh Edition. Oxford University Press. 2010. Chapter 9. Pages 287 to 320.
Marten Broberg. "Preliminary References as a Means for Enforcing EU Law". Jakab and Kochenov (eds). The Enforcement of EU Law and Values. 2017. Chapter 6. Pages 99 to 111.
Witte, Mayoral, Jaremba, Wind and Podstawa (eds). National Courts and EU Law. Edward Elgar. 2016.
Bruno de Witte. "The preliminary ruling dialogue: three types of questions posed by national courts". Chapter 2. Page 15 et seq.
Urszula Jaremba. "Polish civil judiciary vis-a-vis the preliminary ruling procedure: in search of a mid-range theory". Chapter 4. Page 49 et seq.
The Court of Justice of the European Union: Multidisciplinary Perspectives. (Swedish Studies in European Law, volume 10). Hart Publishing. Bloomsbury. 2018.
Ulf Bernitz. "Preliminary Rulings to the CJEU and the Swedish Judiciary: Current Developments". Chapter 2. Pages 17 to 34.
Anna Wallerman. "Referring Court Influence in the Preliminary Ruling Procedure: The Swedish Example". Chapter 9. Pages 153 to 170.

European Union law
Court of Justice of the European Union